Endo may refer to:

 Endo or stoppie, a motorcycle and bicycle trick in which the back wheel is lifted by abruptly applying the front brake
Endo people, an ethnic group in Kenya
Endo language, the native language of the Endo people
 Endo (band), a nu-metal band
 Endō, a Japanese surname
 Endō Shōta, a Japanese professional Sumo wrestler
 Endo International, a company specializing in drugs for pain management
 Ex parte Endo, a 1944 United States Supreme Court decision
 Endodontics, field of dentistry
 Endo contractualization, a term for short-term employment in the Philippines.

As a prefix 
Endo, a prefix from Greek ἔνδον endon meaning "within, inner, absorbing, or containing"
 Endoscope, an implement used in minimally invasive surgery
 Endometriosis, a disease that relates to a person's internal organs 
 Endogamy, the practice of marrying within a specific ethnic group, class, or social group
 Endo-exo isomerism, in chemistry, a specific stereochemical relationship in molecular geometry
 Endomorphism, in mathematics, a homomorphism from a mathematical object to itself
 Endogenous, meaning "proceeding from within". In biology, endogenous substances are those that originate from within an organism, tissue, or cell.
 Endogeneity (disambiguation), the property of being influenced within a system
 Endoskeleton
 Endocannibalism, a practice of eating the flesh of a dead human being from the same community.
For other possible words, see

As an acronym, abbreviation or nickname
 ENDO, name of the annual meeting and conference of The Endocrine Society
 Endo, short for 'endodontic root treatment' in dentistry, otherwise known as a root canal
 Endo, a cycling trick also known as a  stoppie, after the possible outcome of flipping "end-over-end" if performed incorrectly
 Endo, a slang abbreviation in cycling for an "end over end" accident
 Endo, a nickname for marijuana
 Endo, short for endometriosis

See also
 Ecto-, a prefix meaning "outside"
  ex- or Exo-, a prefix meaning "outer"